Lorentz's whistler (Pachycephala lorentzi) is a species of bird in the family Pachycephalidae.
It is found in the mid-western New Guinea Highlands.
Its natural habitat is subtropical or tropical moist montane forests. It was originally described as a subspecies of the regent whistler

References

Lorentz's whistler
Birds of New Guinea
Lorentz's whistler
Taxonomy articles created by Polbot